Axminster is a market town and civil parish on the eastern border of the county of Devon in England. The town is built on a hill overlooking the River Axe which heads towards the English Channel at Axmouth, and is in the East Devon local government district. At the 2001 census, it had a population of 5,626, increasing to 5,761 at the 2011 census. The town contains two electoral wards (town and rural) the total sum of both wards being a population of 7,110. The market is still held every Thursday.

Axminster gave its name to a type of carpet. An Axminster-type power loom is capable of weaving high quality carpets with many varying colours and patterns. While Axminster carpets are made in the town by Axminster Carpets Ltd, this type of carpet is now manufactured all over the world as well.

History

The town dates back to the Celtic times of around 300 BC. It lies on two major Roman roads: the Fosse Way from Lincoln to Seaton, and the Dorchester to Exeter road. There was a Roman fort on the crossroads at Woodbury Farm, just south of the present town. Axminster appears on the Peutinger Map, one of only 15 British towns on that Roman era map.

The history of the town is very much linked to the carpet industry, started by Thomas Whitty at Court House near the church in 1755. The completion of the early hand tufted carpets was marked by a peal of bells from the parish church as it took a great amount of time and labour to complete them. Axminster carpets continue to this day providing carpets for Buckingham Palace, Windsor Castle and other royalty-owned addresses.

In 1210, a charter was granted to the town that included the right to hold a weekly cattle market which took place in the market square until it was moved to Trinity Square in 1834. It then moved in October 1912 to a site off South Street where it was held for 94 years. It finally closed in 2006 in the aftermath of the 2001 United Kingdom foot-and-mouth outbreak. A building on the site then continued to be used for a general auction until all the buildings were demolished and replaced by a housing development.

The town was on the coaching route from London to Exeter. In 1760 a coaching inn named The George Hotel was opened on the corner of Lyme Street and Chard Street on the site of an old inn called the Cross Keys that was destroyed by fire in 1759. Over 16 coaches a day would stop at the hotel in its heyday for refreshments and to change horses, the building is now currently under refurbishment. Axminster was on the route of The Trafalgar Way which is the name given to the historic route used to carry dispatches with the news of the Battle of Trafalgar overland from Falmouth, Cornwall, to the Admiralty in London in 1805 and there is a plaque commemorating this fact in the town centre.

Part of the parish of Axminster had historically been an exclave of Dorset until the Counties (Detached Parts) Act 1844, when it was fully incorporated into Devon.

Axminster railway station was opened on 19 July 1860, with the London and South Western Railway (LSWR) offering direct services between Queen Street station in Exeter and Yeovil.  The station building was designed by the LSWR's architect Sir William Tite in mock gothic style. In 1903, the branch line from Axminster to Lyme Regis was opened. This branch line was closed with the Beeching cuts, in the 1960s. One engine has been preserved on the Bluebell Line, in Sussex, while the station was dismantled and reconstructed at New Alresford, on the Watercress Line, in Hampshire.

Axminster is the southern starting point of the Taunton Stop Line, a World War II defensive line consisting of pillboxes and anti-tank obstacles, which runs north to the Somerset coast near Highbridge.

Nearby Kilmington was used as a location for the 1998 LWT adaptation of Tess of the d'Urbervilles. The celebrity chef and TV presenter Hugh Fearnley-Whittingstall has his River Cottage H.Q. at a  farm in the Axe valley. He has since purchased an old inn that once provided the ballroom of the town, now converted to an organic produce shop/market and canteen.

Geography
The hamlet of Abbey Gate lies to the south of the town near the A35 and A358 intersection.

Other villages within  of Axminster include Chardstock, Colyford, Combpyne, Dalwood, Hawkchurch, Kilmington, Membury, Musbury, Raymond's Hill, Rousdon, Shute, Smallridge, Tytherleigh, Uplyme and Whitford.

Landmarks
 Axminster Museum
 Blackdown Hills Area of Outstanding Natural Beauty
 East Devon Area of Outstanding Natural Beauty
 East Devon Way
 Forde Abbey
 Jurassic Coast
 Lambert's Castle
 Loughwood Meeting House
 Musbury Castle
 Shute Barton

Amenities

The town has Cloakham Lawns, the Axe Valley Sports Centre and Flamingo Swimming Pool, a library, several churches and a museum of local history. Shops include three supermarkets, Trinity House, and several independent retailers. The Guildhall is a theatre with meeting rooms that hosts many events and clubs such as Axminster Drama Club and Axminster Operatic Society. The town is also home to a small, local hospital.

Education
 Axe Valley Academy
 Axminster Community Primary School
 St. Mary's Primary School
 All Saints Community Primary School

Transport

Road
Axminster is at the crossroads of the A358, which links with the A303 at Ilminster, and the A35 from Southampton to Honiton, which has been diverted by a bypass to the south of the town.

Rail
Axminster railway station is on the West of England Main Line that runs from Exeter via Salisbury to London Waterloo.

Bus
Axminster is served by AVMT Buses' service 885 to local towns & villages including Seaton, Beer & Colyton.  Stagecoach South West, The Buses of Somerset and First Hampshire & Dorset provide long-distance services to Exeter, Weymouth, Dorchester and Taunton.

Twin towns
 Douvres-la-Délivrande, France

Historic estates
Weycroft, Axminster

Notable people 
Steve Benbow, folk musician
William Buckland, geologist and palaeontologist

See also
Taunton Stop Line

Notes

References
 Mee, A. The King's England: Devon (Hodder and Stoughton, 1965); pp. 25–26.
 Mills, A. D. Dictionary of English Place-Names. Oxford University Press. .

External links

 
 Devon Local Studies – Axminster community page
 

 
Towns in Devon
Market towns in Devon
East Devon District